The Braille pattern dots-1346 is a 6-dot braille cell with both top and both bottom dots raised, or an 8-dot braille cell with both top and both lower-middle dots raised. It is represented by the Unicode code point U+282d, and in Braille ASCII with an X.

Unified Braille

In unified international braille, the braille pattern dots-1346 is used to represent a voiceless velar fricative, i.e. /x/, or otherwise as needed.

Table of unified braille values

Other braille

Plus dots 7 and 8

Related to Braille pattern dots-1346 are Braille patterns 13467, 13468, and 134678, which are used in 8-dot braille systems, such as Gardner-Salinas and Luxembourgish Braille.

Related 8-dot kantenji patterns

In the Japanese kantenji braille, the standard 8-dot Braille patterns 2578, 12578, 24578, and 124578 are the patterns related to Braille pattern dots-1346, since the two additional dots of kantenji patterns 01346, 13467, and 013467 are placed above the base 6-dot cell, instead of below, as in standard 8-dot braille.

Kantenji using braille patterns 2578, 12578, 24578, or 124578

This listing includes kantenji using Braille pattern dots-1346 for all 6349 kanji found in JIS C 6226-1978.

  - 女

Variants and thematic compounds

  -  selector 3 + ふ/女  =  聿
  -  selector 4 + ふ/女  =  不
  -  selector 5 + ふ/女  =  賁
  -  ふ/女 + selector 1  =  舟
  -  ふ/女 + selector 4  =  丹
  -  ふ/女 + selector 5  =  妹
  -  比 + ふ/女  =  屯

Compounds of 女

  -  ふ/女 + ふ/女 + ふ/女  =  姦
  -  こ/子 + ふ/女  =  好
  -  ほ/方 + ふ/女  =  妄
  -  仁/亻 + ほ/方 + ふ/女  =  侫
  -  の/禾 + ふ/女  =  委
  -  く/艹 + ふ/女  =  萎
  -  な/亻 + の/禾 + ふ/女  =  倭
  -  や/疒 + の/禾 + ふ/女  =  矮
  -  ひ/辶 + の/禾 + ふ/女  =  逶
  -  ひ/辶 + ふ/女  =  威
  -  い/糹/#2 + ひ/辶 + ふ/女  =  縅
  -  せ/食 + ひ/辶 + ふ/女  =  鰄
  -  ん/止 + ふ/女  =  婚
  -  け/犬 + ふ/女  =  嫌
  -  う/宀/#3 + ふ/女  =  安
  -  と/戸 + ふ/女  =  鞍
  -  て/扌 + ふ/女  =  按
  -  ふ/女 + き/木  =  案
  -  日 + う/宀/#3 + ふ/女  =  晏
  -  せ/食 + う/宀/#3 + ふ/女  =  鮟
  -  ⺼ + ふ/女  =  腰
  -  に/氵 + ふ/女  =  要
  -  ふ/女 + ゑ/訁  =  奴
  -  ふ/女 + 心  =  怒
  -  れ/口 + ふ/女 + ゑ/訁  =  呶
  -  こ/子 + ふ/女 + ゑ/訁  =  孥
  -  し/巿 + ふ/女 + ゑ/訁  =  帑
  -  ゆ/彳 + ふ/女 + ゑ/訁  =  弩
  -  て/扌 + ふ/女 + ゑ/訁  =  拏
  -  そ/馬 + ふ/女 + ゑ/訁  =  駑
  -  ふ/女 + か/金  =  奸
  -  ふ/女 + れ/口  =  如
  -  に/氵 + ふ/女 + れ/口  =  洳
  -  い/糹/#2 + ふ/女 + れ/口  =  絮
  -  く/艹 + ふ/女 + れ/口  =  茹
  -  ふ/女 + れ/口 + れ/口  =  嬋
  -  ふ/女 + に/氵  =  妊
  -  ふ/女 + ね/示  =  妍
  -  ふ/女 + は/辶  =  妓
  -  ふ/女 + そ/馬  =  妙
  -  ふ/女 + 比  =  妣
  -  ふ/女 + 龸  =  妥
  -  い/糹/#2 + ふ/女 + 龸  =  綏
  -  せ/食 + ふ/女 + 龸  =  餒
  -  ふ/女 + ほ/方  =  妨
  -  ふ/女 + さ/阝  =  妻
  -  る/忄 + ふ/女 + さ/阝  =  悽
  -  に/氵 + ふ/女 + さ/阝  =  淒
  -  く/艹 + ふ/女 + さ/阝  =  萋
  -  ね/示 + ふ/女 + さ/阝  =  褄
  -  ふ/女 + ま/石  =  妾
  -  き/木 + ふ/女 + ま/石  =  椄
  -  ち/竹 + ふ/女 + ま/石  =  霎
  -  ふ/女 + し/巿  =  姉
  -  ふ/女 + な/亻  =  始
  -  ふ/女 + い/糹/#2  =  姓
  -  ふ/女 + と/戸  =  姥
  -  ふ/女 + す/発  =  姫
  -  ふ/女 + け/犬  =  姻
  -  ふ/女 + ん/止  =  姿
  -  ふ/女 + や/疒  =  娘
  -  ふ/女 + ろ/十  =  娠
  -  ふ/女 + こ/子  =  娯
  -  ふ/女 + ひ/辶  =  婆
  -  ふ/女 + り/分  =  婦
  -  ふ/女 + よ/广  =  婿
  -  ふ/女 + ふ/女 + よ/广  =  壻
  -  ふ/女 + る/忄  =  媒
  -  ふ/女 + め/目  =  媚
  -  ふ/女 + 仁/亻  =  媛
  -  ふ/女 + ら/月  =  媼
  -  ふ/女 + う/宀/#3  =  嫁
  -  ふ/女 + お/頁  =  嫡
  -  ふ/女 + つ/土  =  嬉
  -  ふ/女 + み/耳  =  嬢
  -  ふ/女 + ふ/女 + み/耳  =  孃
  -  ふ/女 + を/貝  =  嬰
  -  れ/口 + ふ/女 + を/貝  =  嚶
  -  へ/⺩ + ふ/女 + を/貝  =  瓔
  -  い/糹/#2 + ふ/女 + を/貝  =  纓
  -  ふ/女 + 氷/氵  =  汝
  -  ふ/女 + 氷/氵 + ほ/方  =  娑
  -  仁/亻 + 宿 + ふ/女  =  佞
  -  ふ/女 + 比 + も/門  =  妁
  -  ふ/女 + 宿 + け/犬  =  妖
  -  や/疒 + う/宀/#3 + ふ/女  =  妛
  -  へ/⺩ + 宿 + ふ/女  =  妝
  -  ふ/女 + 宿 + ま/石  =  妬
  -  ふ/女 + selector 4 + 日  =  妲
  -  ふ/女 + 比 + は/辶  =  姆
  -  ふ/女 + selector 5 + そ/馬  =  姐
  -  ふ/女 + れ/口 + ろ/十  =  姑
  -  ふ/女 + 仁/亻 + に/氵  =  姙
  -  ふ/女 + 宿 + 宿  =  姚
  -  そ/馬 + 宿 + ふ/女  =  姜
  -  ふ/女 + ゆ/彳 + な/亻  =  姨
  -  ふ/女 + selector 4 + ゆ/彳  =  姪
  -  ふ/女 + り/分 + 囗  =  姶
  -  ふ/女 + 宿 + つ/土  =  娃
  -  ふ/女 + 宿 + も/門  =  娉
  -  ふ/女 + う/宀/#3 + ぬ/力  =  娚
  -  ふ/女 + 宿 + さ/阝  =  娜
  -  ふ/女 + 宿 + ら/月  =  娟
  -  ふ/女 + 囗 + selector 1  =  娥
  -  ふ/女 + ぬ/力 + 宿  =  娩
  -  ふ/女 + 龸 + ゑ/訁  =  娵
  -  ふ/女 + み/耳 + ゑ/訁  =  娶
  -  ふ/女 + り/分 + 日  =  娼
  -  ふ/女 + さ/阝 + か/金  =  婀
  -  ふ/女 + 宿 + う/宀/#3  =  婉
  -  ふ/女 + た/⽥ + さ/阝  =  婢
  -  ふ/女 + き/木 + き/木  =  婪
  -  ふ/女 + 数 + に/氵  =  婬
  -  ふ/女 + 宿 + そ/馬  =  媽
  -  ふ/女 + 宿 + む/車  =  媾
  -  ふ/女 + selector 5 + え/訁  =  嫂
  -  ふ/女 + や/疒 + selector 5  =  嫉
  -  ふ/女 + ゆ/彳 + ゆ/彳  =  嫋
  -  ふ/女 + た/⽥ + ぬ/力  =  嫐
  -  ふ/女 + に/氵 + ね/示  =  嫖
  -  ふ/女 + も/門 + selector 3  =  嫗
  -  ふ/女 + selector 6 + ん/止  =  嫣
  -  ふ/女 + 龸 + し/巿  =  嫦
  -  ふ/女 + 宿 + ん/止  =  嫩
  -  ふ/女 + も/門 + ら/月  =  嫺
  -  ふ/女 + も/門 + き/木  =  嫻
  -  ふ/女 + 宿 + の/禾  =  嬌
  -  ふ/女 + selector 6 + ま/石  =  嬖
  -  ふ/女 + う/宀/#3 + を/貝  =  嬪
  -  ふ/女 + ち/竹 + の/禾  =  嬬
  -  た/⽥ + 宿 + ふ/女  =  嬲
  -  ふ/女 + め/目 + た/⽥  =  嬶
  -  ふ/女 + お/頁 + 数  =  嬾
  -  ふ/女 + ち/竹 + き/木  =  孀
  -  ふ/女 + 宿 + み/耳  =  孅
  -  ふ/女 + 宿 + 心  =  恕
  -  へ/⺩ + う/宀/#3 + ふ/女  =  珱
  -  や/疒 + 宿 + ふ/女  =  痿

Compounds of 聿

  -  は/辶 + ふ/女  =  建
  -  な/亻 + ふ/女  =  健
  -  ⺼ + は/辶 + ふ/女  =  腱
  -  ゆ/彳 + ふ/女  =  律
  -  心 + ゆ/彳 + ふ/女  =  葎
  -  日 + ふ/女  =  書
  -  氷/氵 + ふ/女  =  津
  -  火 + ふ/女  =  燼
  -  ち/竹 + ふ/女  =  筆
  -  ふ/女 + 火  =  尽
  -  な/亻 + ふ/女 + 火  =  侭
  -  ふ/女 + ふ/女 + 火  =  盡
  -  仁/亻 + ふ/女 + 火  =  儘
  -  つ/土 + ふ/女 + 火  =  壗
  -  を/貝 + ふ/女 + 火  =  贐
  -  ふ/女 + た/⽥  =  画
  -  ふ/女 + ふ/女 + た/⽥  =  畫
  -  ぬ/力 + ふ/女 + た/⽥  =  劃
  -  や/疒 + selector 3 + ふ/女  =  肄
  -  と/戸 + 宿 + ふ/女  =  肆
  -  ふ/女 + と/戸 + れ/口  =  肇

Compounds of 不

  -  き/木 + ふ/女  =  杯
  -  ふ/女 + 囗  =  否
  -  や/疒 + ふ/女 + 囗  =  痞
  -  つ/土 + selector 4 + ふ/女  =  坏
  -  て/扌 + selector 4 + ふ/女  =  抔
  -  す/発 + selector 4 + ふ/女  =  罘
  -  ふ/女 + 数 + selector 1  =  丕
  -  ⺼ + selector 4 + ふ/女  =  胚
  -  ふ/女 + ん/止 + い/糹/#2  =  歪
  -  ふ/女 + selector 4 + ⺼  =  盃

Compounds of 賁

  -  れ/口 + ふ/女  =  噴
  -  つ/土 + ふ/女  =  墳
  -  る/忄 + ふ/女  =  憤
  -  に/氵 + 宿 + ふ/女  =  濆

Compounds of 舟

  -  ふ/女 + の/禾  =  般
  -  ふ/女 + て/扌  =  搬
  -  き/木 + ふ/女 + の/禾  =  槃
  -  や/疒 + ふ/女 + の/禾  =  瘢
  -  ふ/女 + 宿  =  航
  -  ふ/女 + 日  =  舶
  -  ふ/女 + え/訁  =  船
  -  ふ/女 + へ/⺩  =  艇
  -  ふ/女 + ⺼  =  艦
  -  ふ/女 + selector 1 + そ/馬  =  艚
  -  ふ/女 + selector 6 + こ/子  =  舩
  -  ふ/女 + 宿 + ほ/方  =  舫
  -  ふ/女 + 宿 + と/戸  =  舮
  -  ふ/女 + た/⽥ + selector 4  =  舳
  -  ふ/女 + 宿 + ひ/辶  =  舵
  -  ふ/女 + 龸 + ゐ/幺  =  舷
  -  ふ/女 + 比 + か/金  =  舸
  -  ふ/女 + 氷/氵 + う/宀/#3  =  艀
  -  ふ/女 + 宿 + え/訁  =  艘
  -  ふ/女 + り/分 + お/頁  =  艙
  -  ふ/女 + ち/竹 + せ/食  =  艝
  -  ふ/女 + ま/石 + り/分  =  艟
  -  ふ/女 + 囗 + れ/口  =  艢
  -  ふ/女 + そ/馬 + 囗  =  艤
  -  ふ/女 + 宿 + く/艹  =  艨
  -  ふ/女 + 宿 + 日  =  艪
  -  ふ/女 + 宿 + た/⽥  =  艫

Compounds of 丹

  -  ほ/方 + ふ/女 + selector 4  =  旃
  -  心 + ふ/女 + selector 4  =  栴

Compounds of 屯

  -  い/糹/#2 + ふ/女  =  純
  -  か/金 + ふ/女  =  鈍
  -  お/頁 + ふ/女  =  頓
  -  れ/口 + お/頁 + ふ/女  =  噸
  -  に/氵 + 比 + ふ/女  =  沌
  -  か/金 + 比 + ふ/女  =  瓲
  -  さ/阝 + 比 + ふ/女  =  邨
  -  せ/食 + 比 + ふ/女  =  飩

Other compounds

  -  も/門 + ふ/女  =  匐
  -  宿 + ふ/女  =  富
  -  selector 1 + 宿 + ふ/女  =  冨
  -  し/巿 + ふ/女  =  幅
  -  ね/示 + ふ/女  =  福
  -  む/車 + ふ/女  =  輻
  -  ふ/女 + ぬ/力  =  副
  -  心 + 宿 + ふ/女  =  蔔
  -  む/車 + 宿 + ふ/女  =  蝠
  -  ひ/辶 + 宿 + ふ/女  =  逼
  -  仁/亻 + ふ/女  =  巫
  -  ち/竹 + 仁/亻 + ふ/女  =  筮
  -  れ/口 + 仁/亻 + ふ/女  =  噬
  -  え/訁 + 仁/亻 + ふ/女  =  誣
  -  ふ/女 + 宿 + せ/食  =  鵐
  -  龸 + ふ/女  =  当
  -  き/木 + 龸 + ふ/女  =  档
  -  龸 + 龸 + ふ/女  =  當
  -  ま/石 + 龸 + ふ/女  =  礑
  -  む/車 + 龸 + ふ/女  =  蟷
  -  ね/示 + 龸 + ふ/女  =  襠
  -  か/金 + 龸 + ふ/女  =  鐺
  -  ま/石 + ふ/女  =  普
  -  え/訁 + ふ/女  =  譜
  -  心 + ふ/女  =  藤
  -  心 + 心 + ふ/女  =  籐
  -  さ/阝 + ふ/女  =  阜
  -  つ/土 + さ/阝 + ふ/女  =  埠
  -  せ/食 + ふ/女  =  飾
  -  ち/竹 + 宿 + ふ/女  =  籘

Notes

Braille patterns